Faizabad division, officially known as Ayodhya division, is an administrative geographical unit of Uttar Pradesh state in India. Ayodhya is the administrative headquarters of the division. The government of Uttar Pradesh approved the renaming of the Faizabad division to Ayodhya division in November 2018.

The division currently consists of the following 5 districts:
 Ambedkar Nagar
 Amethi
 Barabanki  
 Faizabad (officially Ayodhya)
 Sultanpur

Demographics 

The 2011 Indian census did not use the new organisation.  The districts at the time consisted of Bara Banki, Faizabad, Ambedkar Nagar, and Sultanpur. The latter had different sub-districts than now.

References

 
Divisions of Uttar Pradesh